Ania Teliczan is a Polish singer-songwriter who rose to fame as a finalist of the second series of television show Poland's Got Talent in 2009. Soon after the end of the show, she was signed by Sony Music Poland. Her debut album was released on 16 January 2012 and had been recorded in the United Kingdom with producer Troy Miller, who previously worked with Amy Winehouse. It consists of 10 songs in style of 60's in English and Polish, some of which written by Andrzej Piaseczny and Teliczan herself.

Poland's Got Talent
List of songs sung by Anna Teliczan on Poland's Got Talent:

Discography

Albums

Singles

As featured artist

References

External links
Official site

Year of birth missing (living people)
Living people
People from Ostróda County
Polish singer-songwriters
Got Talent contestants
Polish women singers
Polish pop singers